The Fort Pierre Congregational Church is a historic church in Fort Pierre, South Dakota. It was built in 1908–09 and was added to the National Register in 1977 as the United Church of Christ, Congregational.

It is a brick church on a sandstone foundation, and has a hipped roof and a square tower.  It has fifteen stained glass windows and was built at cost of about $12,000.

References

Churches on the National Register of Historic Places in South Dakota
Gothic Revival church buildings in South Dakota
Churches completed in 1909
Buildings and structures in Stanley County, South Dakota
National Register of Historic Places in Stanley County, South Dakota